ʿAbd Allāh ibn Muḥammad also known as al-Ṭāhir and al-Ṭayyib was one of the sons of Muhammad and Khadija. He died in childhood.

His full name was Abd Allah ibn Muhammad ibn Abd Allah ibn Shaiba. His father,  became a successful merchant and was involved in trade. Due to his upright character Muhammad acquired the nickname "al-Amin" (Arabic: الامين), meaning "faithful, trustworthy" and "al-Sadiq" meaning "truthful" and was sought out as an impartial arbitrator. His reputation attracted a proposal in 595 from Khadija, a successful businesswoman. Muhammad consented to the marriage, which by all accounts was a happy one. After the marriage was consummated, his elder brother al-Qasim was born. Qasim was the eldest son of Muhammad and Khadija. After Qasim, his four sisters were born. Abd Allah was born around 611. He was the youngest child of Muhammad and Khadija.

Muhammad gave him the name of his father. Abd Allah died at 4 in 615 CE.

Siblings

Qasim ibn Muhammad
Zainab bint Muhammad
Ruqayya bint Muhammad
Umm Kulthum bint Muhammad
Fatima bint Muhammad
Ibrahim ibn Muhammad

References 

 Children of Muhammad
600s births
615 deaths
 Place of birth unknown
 Place of death unknown
 Burials at Jannat al-Mu'alla

Child deaths